Pauline Lettice Yates (16 June 1929 – 21 January 2015) was an English actress, best known for playing Elizabeth Perrin in the BBC television sitcom The Fall and Rise of Reginald Perrin. She also starred in Bachelor Father and Keep It in the Family.

Early life and career
Yates was born in St Helens, Lancashire, on 16 June 1929. She began her acting career by joining Oldham Rep straight after leaving Childwall Valley High School for Girls. At the age of 17 she made her stage debut in a dramatised version of Jane Eyre, playing Grace Poole.

In 1957 Yates was cast in the role of Estelle Waterman on Emergency Ward 10, after which she became a regular face on British television and also appeared in a few British films. In the 1960s she made guest appearances on Armchair Theatre, Dixon of Dock Green, Z-Cars, Gideon's Way, Nightingale's Boys, The Human Jungle and The Ronnie Barker Playhouse, "Maigret", among others. (She appeared again with Ronnie Barker in Lines From My Grandfather's Forehead, a comedy sketch show for radio, which was first broadcast on BBC Radio 4 from 15 February 1971.) In 1970 she appeared as Mme Arnoux in Sentimental Education with Robert Powell. In 1972 she starred in her own series, Harriet's Back in Town, produced by Thames Television. The cast included William Russell and Sally Bazely. In 1975, she co-starred with Derek Nimmo in the short-lived sitcom My Honourable Mrs, in which she played Jane Prendergast, a housewife who becomes a Conservative MP like her husband Derek Prendergast (Derek Nimmo). Yates was later cast as Elizabeth Perrin in The Fall and Rise of Reginald Perrin (1976–79), and its follow-up The Legacy of Reginald Perrin (1996).

Later life and career
Yates's ability as a comedy foil was further utilised in the ITV sitcom Keep It in the Family (Thames, 1980–82) where she played wife to the frustratingly eccentric comic-strip artist Dudley Rush (played by Robert Gillespie) that sustained five series; Yates did not feature in the 1983 series.

She appeared onstage in an Oxford Playhouse Company production of the Joe Orton play, What the Butler Saw at the Teatr y Werin in Aberystwyth, Wales, with William Russell and Michael Barrington in the cast. In 1987 she played the lead in Alan Ayckbourn's play Woman in Mind for the same company. Yates acted in David Pownall's Leicester Haymarket stage adaptation of Jane Austen's novel, Pride and Prejudice, directed by Bill Pryde in 1985. In 1989 Yates appeared in the play, Talking to Angels at the Theatre Museum in London.

Personal life
Yates married actor/writer Donald Churchill in 1960. The couple had two daughters, Jemma and Polly, and lived for many years in Primrose Hill, North London. Donald Churchill died on set in 1991 after filming his final episode of El C.I.D. for Granada Television in which he played the irascible harbour master Metcalf. Jemma Churchill is also an actress and Polly Churchill was a writer. Polly Churchill died in 2018 after a two-year relationship with Christopher Nichols, the widower of Francis Crick's youngest daughter Jacqueline. Yates had three grandchildren.

Death
Pauline Yates died in London, on 21 January 2015, aged 85.

Filmography

References

External links
 
 Biography at Official Reginald Perrin site; accessed 29 January 2015.
 Pauline Yates profile, Aveleyman.com; accessed 29 January 2015.
 Listing of Pauline Yates' radio work accessed 14 February 2015.

1929 births
2015 deaths
English film actresses
English stage actresses
English television actresses
People educated at Childwall Valley High School for Girls
People from St Helens, Merseyside
20th-century English actresses
21st-century English actresses